Deh-e Jan or Deh Jan or Dehjan may refer to:
 Deh Jan, Gilan